Changshaoying Manchu Ethnic Township is an ethnic township situated in the northeastern portion of Huairou District, Beijing, China. It borders Hushiha Town in its northeast, Maquanzi Village in its east, Majiayu Town in its southeast, Tanghekou Town in its southwest, and Labagoumen Manchu Ethnic Township in its northwest. It had a population of 5,378 as of 2020. The name Changshaoying literally translates to "Long Whistle Barrack".

History

Administrative divisions 
In 2021, Changshaoying Manchu Ethnic Township oversaw 24 villages under its administration:

See also 

 List of township-level divisions of Beijing

References 

Huairou District
Ethnic townships of the People's Republic of China
Township-level divisions of Beijing